Yee Hope Football Club is a now defunct Hong Kong football club which played in the Hong Kong First Division League between 1997 and 2001. In 1999–00 and 2000–01, the team played in the name Orient & Yee Hope Union due to sponsorship reasons.

Honours

Domestic

Cups
Hong Kong Senior Challenge Shield
Winners (1): 2000–01
Hong Kong FA Cup
Finalists (1): 1999–2000
Hong Kong Junior FA Cup
Winners (1): 1996–97

References

Football clubs in Hong Kong
Defunct football clubs in Hong Kong
Association football clubs established in 1992
Association football clubs disestablished in 2001
1992 establishments in Hong Kong
2001 disestablishments in Hong Kong